Coconut Grove station is a station on the Metrorail rapid transit system on the western end of the Coconut Grove neighborhood of Miami, Florida. The station is located at the intersection of South Dixie Highway (US 1) and West 27th Avenue/Grapeland Boulevard (SR 9), opening to service May 20, 1984.

In 2018, there were plans to make the station entirely solar-powered.

Station layout
The station has two tracks served by an island platform, with a parking lot just north of the platform.

References

External links
MDT – Metrorail Stations
 Station from Google Maps Street View

Green Line (Metrorail)
Orange Line (Metrorail)
Metrorail (Miami-Dade County) stations in Miami
Railway stations in the United States opened in 1984
1984 establishments in Florida